"Co-Dependents' Day" is the fifteenth episode of the fifteenth season of the American animated television series The Simpsons. It originally aired on the Fox network in the United States on March 21, 2004.

Plot
Homer, Bart, and Lisa see the newest Cosmic Wars film, The Gathering Shadow, and the movie turns out to be less than what they expected. At home, Marge suggests that Bart and Lisa write a letter to Cosmic Wars creator Randall Curtis. Two weeks later, they get a reply from Curtis, which completely ignores their criticism, having sent them Jim-Jam merchandise. This forces the Simpsons to go on a trip to California, where Homer and Marge go to wineries, and Bart and Lisa go to the Cosmic Wars Ranch. The kids visit Curtis, and tell him that his Cosmic Wars movies have lost their way. Curtis dismisses their criticisms, until Lisa explains that improved technology does not count for story and characterization. Curtis agrees, and decides to go back to his storytelling roots by watching more samurai films and Westerns for inspiration.

Bart and Lisa rejoin Homer and Marge, who are both drunk from free samples of the wine. Back in Springfield, Homer and Marge go to Moe's Tavern and drink more wine. Moe opens a bottle of Château Latour 1886 vintage wine, clearly unaware of its value. Homer and Marge then continue to drink heavily for several days, until Marge suffers a particularly painful hangover. She tells Homer that they should not be drinking, and he agrees. Unfortunately, when they go to an Oktoberfest featuring Grammy-winning nuclear polka band Brave Combo, Marge, who tries to go through the night without drinking, gives in and ends up drunk along with Homer. He tries to drive them home, but in a drunken stupor overturns the car.

In order to avoid an arrest, Homer makes things look like Marge (who is drunker than he is) was the driver. She is arrested, but he bails her out. Later, Barney suggests that Marge go to a rehab clinic for a month, and when Marge is gone, Homer lets Ned Flanders take care of the kids. When he sees her at the clinic, he confesses, but Marge is angry and drinks again. Later on, the other rehab patients help her discover that she likes being with Homer more than she likes drinking, and forgives him and returns home, though she makes him promise to cut back on his drinking.

Production notes
 The scene where Homer sings at Moe's Tavern while Marge plays the piano was cut from this episode, but later used in "Mommie Beerest" as a postscript scene during the end credits.
 Homer references a prior DUI when explaining why he cannot be caught in the drivers seat. This could possibly be referring to the episode, "Duffless," where he fails a breathalyzer test, and is arrested for a DWI.
 Series creator Matt Groening learned of Dallas-area band Brave Combo as a college-radio DJ in the 1980s, and had commissioned the Grammy-winning band, (Best Polka Album 1999, 2004) to perform at "his best friend's wedding party", where Groening invited them to appear on the show. According to Carl Finch, founding member of the band, within two weeks, the network contacted them for video reference material for the animators for their "Springfield-yellow likenesses." The band recorded a polka arrangement of The Simpsons theme song, and made available two other songs for use in the Oktoberfest scene on the show.

Cultural references

Cosmic Wars and Randall Curtis are parodies of the Star Wars prequel trilogy and its director George Lucas; the parodies focus on negative reaction the films received, particularly the criticism of the character Jar Jar Binks (which is represented as "Jim-Jam") and the over-focus on politics. Curtis is also shown as living in rural Californian ranch which houses a high-tech visual effects workshop, a reference to Lucas' Skywalker Ranch.
The film which Otto watches, The Momentum of Things, parodies a film about the decline of coal mining in Northern England, Brassed Off, with similar music to that heard in the film. Otto blames Margaret Thatcher for the hardships, echoing the films' left wing perspective. The film stars Jim Broadbent and Ellen Burstyn.
The title is a play on Independence Day.
The giant robot in The Gathering Shadow, resembling an Imperial AT-AT, sits down and reads the Evening Standard, which is the evening newspaper sold in London, England.
The songs that Homer sings while placing the rehab-center operator on hold are "Wichita Lineman" and "MacArthur Park", both written by Jimmy Webb. 
Marge and Homer are seen leaving The Lizzie McGuire Movie and are clearly disturbed by what they saw.
On entering the Creature Works building in the tour of the Cosmic Wars Studio, the guide says "If you can dream it, we can make it." This is similar to the tagline of the now-defunct Horizons attraction at Epcot, Walt Disney World in Florida, which was "If we can dream it, we can do it."

Reception
James Greene of Nerve.com put the episode sixth on his list Ten Times The Simpsons Jumped the Shark, singling out the storyline of Homer deliberately framing Marge for a crime he committed just to save his own skin. Greene remarked "This Homer wasn't a sometimes-insensitive-but-largely-sympathetic lug. He was just a douche." He did however like the "excellent" B-story, but found that it was "completely overshadowed by a very uncomfortable moment in the Simpson-Bouvier union.”

References

External links
 

The Simpsons (season 15) episodes
2004 American television episodes
Star Wars parodies
Cultural depictions of George Lucas
Television episodes set in California
Television episodes about driving under the influence